Bareilly Sharif Dargah or Dargah-e-Aala Hazrat is a Dargah (tomb) or monument of Ahmed Raza Khan located in Bareilly city in the state of Uttar Pradesh, India. He was a 19th-century Ahle Sunnat, who is known for his staunch opposition of Wahhabis in India. 

The Dome of the Dargah was designed by Shah Mehmood Jaan Qadri with the use of Matchsticks.

Festival
In 2014 during the observation of death anniversary of Ahmed Raza Khan (Urs-e-Razvi) at the Dargah-e-Ala Hazrat, Muslim clerics condemned the terrorism practiced by the Taliban and the ideology of the Wahhabi sect. Although the Dargah was once the main site for the Urs-e-Razavi, the official Urs is also now observed in a dozen countries. This is due to the large crowds and the arrival of many scholars.

See also
 Ajmer Sharif
 All India Tanzeem Ulama-e-Islam
 Barelvi
 Haji Ali Dargah
 Shahabuddin Razvi
 Subhan Raza Khan
 Tauqeer Raza Khan
 Urs-e-Razavi

References 

Dargahs in India
Memorials to Ahmed Raza Khan Barelvi